KRXV, KHWY, and KHYZ are a group of FM radio stations, licensed to Yermo, California, Essex, California and Mountain Pass, California respectively. They collectively broadcast a hot adult contemporary format branded as Highway Vibe. The stations are owned by Richard Heftel's Heftel Broadcasting Company, with studios in Barstow, California.

The trimulcast targets listeners travelling on Interstate 15 and Interstate 40 from Southern California towards Las Vegas and Laughlin, Nevada; alongside their music programming, the stations carry traffic and weather information, information and advertising for events, casinos, nightclubs, and other businesses around Southern Nevada, and businesses in the Barstow area. Heftel owns two other sets of stations with similar formats, including the country music KIXW-FM/KIXF, and Rock KHDR/KHRQ.

History
The concept for the stations was developed by Howard Anderson. At the time, Anderson was the vice president of marketing of the Desert Inn. He recognized that residents of Southern California represented a large portion of Las Vegas tourism, that travelers heading to Vegas on I-15 were a captive audience for advertising local casinos and hotels (as an alternative to prohibitively expensive ad time in Los Angeles itself), and that there were little to no radio stations along the corridor. While his plans were briefly stalled by the death of Desert Inn owner Howard Hughes, Anderson began to actively pursue the establishment of his highway radio stations in 1978. He scouted two transmitter sites; Calico Peaks near Yermo, California, and Clark Mountain near Mountain Pass, California, which he believed would provide sufficient coverage of the route.

The two stations launched as KRXV and KXVR in 1980; their format mixed promotions for Las Vegas attractions with a music playlist drawing from performers associated with the city (such as Frank Sinatra). The music content later shifted to a straightforward adult contemporary format. The morning daypart was used to broadcast local programming and advertising for the Barstow, California market rather than Las Vegas tourism, as Anderson believed that casino advertisers were not interested in the timeslot.

In December 1984, KXVR 99.5 FM increased its power from 2200 Watts to 10,000 Watts.

In April 1988, translator K252CQ 98.3 FM was added to provide supplementary coverage to the Victor Valley area.

In March 1991, KHWY 98.9 FM in Essex was added to provide coverage to Laughlin and along I-40.

In June 1992, KXVR 99.5 FM changed callsigns to KHYZ.

In June 2002, KHYZ 99.5 FM changed frequencies to 99.7 FM and decreased in power to 8,400 watts.

In June 2009, KHYZ 99.7 FM new signal repeater added crucial coverage within the Las Vegas area, since the primary coverage area did not reach into Las Vegas. KHYZ later relocated their main transmitter and increased the power to 50,000 Watts.

In August 2009, The Highway Stations laid off 10 employees, including the 4 on air personalities in favor of a fully automated format, due to budget cuts. The station was then rebranded as The Highway.

In September 2010, Highway Radio merged with What's On, a company which produces What's On Magazine. Highway Radio's Vice President/General Manager was let go along with another employee from the Los Angeles office. The Los Angeles office was then closed down.

The Highway Vibe
On July 2, 2011, after Las Vegas rimshot station KVBE 94.5 The Vibe was taken over by Jelli under a local marketing agreement and relaunched with an interactive CHR format, its previous dance music format The Vibe began to air as a late-night block on the Highway Radio stations. On September 12, 2011, the two stations flipped to dance music full-time as Highway Vibe. The format was short-lived, however; the stations would segue to a hot adult contemporary format by November 2011, maintaining the Highway Vibe branding.

In early-2017, parent company KHWY, Inc. filed for chapter 11 bankruptcy, and the Highway Vibe network was put up for auction. Heftel Broadcasting Company won the auction with a $620,000 bid, with the Educational Media Foundation having offered $525,000 for just KRXV and KHYZ.

Repeaters

Boosters

Coverage
Programming is distributed across three main transmitters covering the Mojave Desert:
 KRXV 98.1 in Yermo, near Barstow.
 KHWY 98.9, added in 1991 to cover Interstate 40 between Essex and Laughlin.
 KHYZ 99.7 in Mountain Pass, California (near the California-Nevada state line), serving Primm and Las Vegas. Originally at 99.5, the frequency switch was made in 2002 to improve reception between Baker and the state line.  The signal was boosted further sometime in 2008 or 2009 in order to be heard better in Las Vegas. The station has a construction permit to move its signal into Las Vegas, along with an increase in power.

Broadcasts can normally be heard beginning as far south as Rosamond, California, on State Route 14 to the State Route 58 turn off in Mojave, California.  The broadcast is audible on State Route 58 from Mojave through Barstow, California, where State Route 58 ends into Interstate 15.  From Barstow north on the 15 broadcast can be heard normally past the Nevada state line and in the Las Vegas Valley itself.  Audible broadcast can normally be picked up on the majority of State Route 138 to its junction with Interstate 15 and also Interstate 40 from Barstow to around Kingman, Arizona.

HD programming
KHYZ-HD2 broadcasts a dance music format, branded as LasVegas.net Radio.  KHYZ-HD3 broadcasts a rock music format, branded as XBOM Radio.

See also
 Highway Country
 The Highway Drive

References

External links

Las Vegas Radio (99.7 HD2)

HD Radio stations
RXV
Hot adult contemporary radio stations in the United States
Barstow, California
Mojave Desert
Needles, California
Mass media in San Bernardino County, California
Radio stations established in 1980
1980 establishments in California